Cumulonimbus cauda is a type of cumulonimbus cloud, cauda is derived from Latin, meaning "tail", this cloud type may appear as a defined horizontal cloud band or as horizontally aligned cloud tags attached to the cumulonimbus murus cloud type,  it is linked with an inflow of warm, moist air and that the thunderstorm the cloud has appeared in is strong, well organized and indicates that severe weather is possible within the area the storm is covering.

References

Cumulus
Severe weather and convection